John Macnish is a British television producer & Self shooting director based in France. He was a TV producer at the BBC studios. He currently films & produces for Channel 4 television.

Life
John Surgeon Macnish was born in Carlisle, England on 25 September 1956. He was educated at Austin Friars School, Carlisle, and Sheffield University, receiving a degree in Prehistory & Archaeology.

As a television producer, he worked for the BBC before setting up his own company, Circlevision Ltd, in 1991. He served as a Senior Lecturer and course leader in Television Production at the University of Central Lancashire from 2009 to 2014.

Television career
After working as a lecturer at the BBC's Engineering Training Department Macnish moved into mainstream TV production
at the BBC studios at Pebble Mill in Birmingham. He was studio director on the live lunchtime light entertainment show 'Daytime Live' and also directed 'The Chelsea Flower Show', 'Top Gear' and 'Scene Today'.
Between 1992 and 1994 Macnish produced the award-winning BBC series 'The Human Animal' written and presented by renowned zoologist Desmond Morris.
In 1996 he produced 'Salmon Against the Tides' presented by Sir David Attenborough a co-production between the BBC & Discovery US.
In 1991 Macnish set up Circlevision Productions in partnership with his wife Jayne. The company went on to produce commercial productions and broadcast series including the notable BBC space science series "Final Frontier" and the observational documentary series following the Beagle 2 project to look for life on Mars led by Prof. Colin Pillinger.

Macnish's production credits include:
Series producer, Scrapheap Challenge, Channel 4
Series producer, Beagle 2-A Mission to Mars, BBC
Series producer, Personal Passions, BBC
Producer, Watercolour Challenge, Channel 4
Producer, Future Weapons, Discovery Channel
Antiques Road Trip, BBC
Series director, Pawn Stars UK, season 2, History Channel.

Bibliography

'Crop Circle Apocalypse' - A personal investigation into the Crop circle phenomenon

References

1956 births
Living people
People from Carlisle, Cumbria
English television producers